¡Limekiller! is a collection of fantasy short stories by Avram Davidson, edited by Grania Davis and Henry Wessells. It was first published in hardcover by Old Earth Books in November 2003. An ebook edition was issued by Gateway/Orion in July 2015.

Summary
The book collects six novellas and novelettes featuring Davidson's adventurer character Jack Limekiller and set in the imaginary Central American colony of British Hidalgo (a fictionalized British Honduras), originally published in various magazines. It includes a preface by Grania Davis, introductions by Lucius Shepard and Peter S. Beagle, and concluding material by Henry Wessells, the author, Grania Davis and Ethan Davidson.

Contents
"Preface: The Adventures of Jack Limekiller in a Far Countrie" (Grania Davis)
"Introduction" (Lucius Shepard)
"Introduction: Jack Limekiller" (Peter S. Beagle)
"Bloody Man"
"There Beneath the Silky-Tree and Whelmed in Deeper Gulphs Than Me"
"Manatee Gal, Won't You Come Out Tonight"
"Sleep Well of Nights"
"Limekiller at Large"
"A Far Countrie"
"Afterwords" (Henry Wessells)
"Along the Lower Moho (The Iguana Church)" (Avram Davidson)
"Dragons in San Francisco - A Sequel" (Grania Davis)
"Afterword" (Ethan Davidson)

Reception
The collection was reviewed by Jonathan Strahan in Locus #514, November 2003, Lucius Shepard in The New York Review of Science Fiction, December 2003, Peter Heck in Asimov's Science Fiction, September 2004, and James L. Cambias in The New York Review of Science Fiction, September 2004.

Awards
The collection placed tenth in the 2004 Locus Poll Award for Best Collection.

Notes

2003 short story collections
Short story collections by Avram Davidson
Fantasy short story collections